The 2016 World Wrestling Olympic Qualification Tournament 1 was the first of two worldwide qualification tournaments for the 2016 Olympics. Competitors at this tournament failed to qualify for the Olympics at the 2015 World Wrestling Championships or at their respective regional qualifier. The top three competitors in each weight class for the men and top two competitors for the women qualified.

It was held between 22–24 April 2016 in Ulaanbaatar, Mongolia.

Men's freestyle

57 kg
24 April

65 kg
24 April

 Following the disqualification of Andriy Kviatkovskyi at the European Qualification Tournament, his spot went to Zurabi Iakobishvili from Georgia. Following this adjustment, Borislav Novachkov earns the Olympic quota won by Georgia.

74 kg
24 April

86 kg
24 April

97 kg
24 April

125 kg
24 April

 Following the disqualification of Alen Zaseyev at the European Qualification Tournament in Serbia, his spot went to Dániel Ligeti from Hungary. Following this adjustment, Aiaal Lazarev earns the Olympic quota won by Hungary. Bulgaria would have been the replacement but was also earned the quota in Serbia.

Men's Greco-Roman

59 kg
22 April

66 kg
22 April

75 kg
22 April

85 kg
22 April

98 kg
22 April

130 kg
22 April

Women's freestyle

48 kg
23 April

53 kg
23 April

58 kg
23 April

63 kg
23 April

69 kg
23 April

75 kg
23 April

References

External links
The Official Link at United World Wrestling

Qualification
Olympic Qualification Tournament
Wrestling
Wrestling
Sport in Ulaanbaatar